The Jacksonville Sharks are a professional indoor football team based in Jacksonville, Florida, playing their home games at VyStar Veterans Memorial Arena. Beginning in 2017, the Sharks began play as charter members of the National Arena League (NAL). They were members of the Arena Football League (AFL) from 2010 to 2016 and won the championship of their division in the first four seasons of their existence.

The Sharks joined the AFL for the 2010 season, following the league's complete reorganization the previous year. In their inaugural season, they set the league record for most regular season wins by an expansion team, winning twelve of their sixteen games, and ranked third in the league in ticket sales and average attendance. They advanced to the 2010 AFL playoffs, claiming the South Division title. In their second year in the league, they advanced to the ArenaBowl XXIV, defeating the Arizona Rattlers 73–70, for the first AFL Championship in franchise history. The Sharks left the AFL after the 2016 season and joined the NAL.

History

Arena Football League (2010–2016)
The Arena Football League originally wanted to place a franchise in Jacksonville in the 1990s, citing the city's historical support for football. The proposal drew the attention of Wayne Weaver, then owner of the Jacksonville Jaguars, but the league decided that the Jacksonville Coliseum was too small for AFL standards. In 2000, the Jacksonville Tomcats began play in the af2, the AFL's developmental league. The AFL and Tomcats ownership anticipated the completion of the new 15,000-seat Jacksonville Veterans Memorial Arena, but the Tomcats folded after the 2002 season, before construction of the Arena was completed.

Interest in placing an arena football team in Jacksonville remained. In 2010, following the restructuring of the AFL and the cancellation of the 2009 season, the AFL announced it would place an expansion team in Jacksonville. The ownership group would be Jacksonville Sports Group, led by Jeff Bouchy, formerly part owner of the Orlando Predators AFL team under his brother Brett Bouchy.  On May 3, 2014, it was officially announced that former Mötley Crüe front man Vince Neil purchased a minority stake in the team.

National Arena League (2017–present)
On October 12, 2016, the Sharks announced that they were leaving the AFL for a rival league beginning with the 2017 season. The Sharks were rejected from their first choice of league, the Indoor Football League (which itself is the home of several former AFL franchises), as the IFL was focused on a regional footprint that did not include Florida.

On November 18, 2016, Sharks owner Jeff Bouchy announced the team has joined the newly formed National Arena League (NAL).  He also announced the hiring for former Toronto Phantoms head coach Mark Stoute as their second head coach in franchise history, replacing interim head coach Bob Landsee. After going undefeated through eight games, Stoute was fired. Siaha Burley was immediately hired as his replacement after serving as the offensive coordinator of the AFL's Cleveland Gladiators. The Sharks nearly went undefeated throughout their inaugural NAL season before losing their home finale against the Monterrey Steel 44–37. They avenged the loss by beating the Steel one week later in the playoff semifinal 43–32 to advance to the championship game.  The Sharks won the inaugural NAL championship game 27–21 over the Columbus Lions.

In 2018, the Jacksonville Sharks went 10–7 under returning head coach Burley. The Sharks advanced to the National Arena League playoffs, but lost on the road to the Carolina Cobras 73–48. The Cobras won the 2018 championship over the Columbus Lions. Following the season, operating manager and majority owner Jeff Bouchy resigned and sold his interest in the team to the other owners on March 11, 2019. The Sharks added another minority owner in Nick Furris on April 26, 2019. The Sharks finished the 2019 season with a 13–1 record and won the league championship.

After the 2019 season, the Sharks did not come to terms with head coach Burley on a contract extension and replaced him with former Maine Mammoths head coach James Fuller. The 2020 season was then cancelled due to the onset of the COVID-19 pandemic. When the league returned in the delayed and shortened 2021 season, Fuller led the team to a 2–6 record and the Sharks missed the playoffs for the first time since joining the NAL. Burley was re-hired as head coach for the 2022 season.

Arena

Since 2010, the Sharks' home arena has been VyStar Veterans Memorial Arena, a $130 million facility.

Notable players

Current roster

Individual awards

All-Arena players
The following Sharks players have been named to All-Arena Teams:
QB Aaron Garcia (1)
FB Derrick Ross (1)
WR Jeron Harvey (1), Tiger Jones (1), Joe Hills (2)
OL Randy Degg (1), Moqut Ruffins (1), Cornelius Lewis (1)
DL Derrick Summers (1), Scooter Berry (1), Jerry Turner (1), Joe Sykes (1)
LB Aaron Robbins (2), Alvin Ray Jackson (1), Dexter Jackson (1)
DB Micheaux Robinson (2), Terrance Smith (1), Greg Reid (2)

All-Ironman players
The following Sharks players have been named to All-Ironman Teams:
WR/KR Jeff Hughley (1)
WR/DB Terrance Smith (1)

All-NAL players
The following Sharks players have been named to All-NAL Teams:
RB Derrick Ross (1)
WR Moe Williams (1)
OT Cornelius Lewis (1), Moqut Ruffins (1)
C A. J. Harmon (1)
DL Jeremiah Price (1), Daylou Pierson (1)
LB Charles Hunt (1)
DB Erick McIntosh (1), Marvin Ross (1), Micheaux Robinson (1)
K Nick Belcher (1),

Notable coaches

Head coaches
Note: Statistics are correct through the 2022 National Arena League season.

Staff

Season-by-season results

References

External links 

 Jacksonville Sharks official website

 
National Arena League teams
American football teams in Florida
American football teams in Jacksonville, Florida
2010 establishments in Florida
American football teams established in 2010